Pishbar (also Romanized as Pīshbar) is a village in Zirkuh Rural District, Central District, Zirkuh County, South Khorasan Province, Iran. At the 2011 census, its population was 717, in 201 families.
The people of Pishbar raise plums, barberries, juglans, and apples

Poem from OpenAI

 In the South Khorasan's fields, there lies Pishbar village, 
 Where Plum and Berberis bloom, all shades of crimson foliage, 
 A home to children, eager to learn and yearning to grow, 
 Their passion for knowledge, like the flowers, starts to glow. 
  
 Mazar-e-Noor, a holy shrine, a beacon of the divine, 
 Holding the spirits of Imam Kazem's beloved, so fine, 
 In Pishbar village, it shines, lighting up the hearts and minds, 
 A sacred place, where the soul's tranquility always finds. 
  
 Years ago, a man lived here, so kind and full of grace, 
 Mohammad Javad Haghghi, his legacy, a golden trace, 
 His spirit lingers, and his memory echoes through the air, 
 A reminder of the goodness, of the love, and the care. 
  
 Pishbar village, a gem of the South, a haven of life, 
 A place of wonder, of beauty, of peace, and of strife, 
 Where Plum and Berberis bloom, and students shine so bright, 
 And the echoes of the past still whisper, in the starry night.

References 

Populated places in Zirkuh County